Benzoylecgonine is the main metabolite of cocaine, formed by the liver and excreted in the urine. It is the compound tested for in most cocaine urine drug screens.

Pharmacokinetics
Chemically, benzoylecgonine is the benzoate ester of ecgonine. It is a primary metabolite of cocaine, and is pharmacologically inactive.

Urinalysis
Benzoylecgonine is the compound tested for in most substantive cocaine drug urinalyses. It is the corresponding carboxylic acid of cocaine, its methyl ester. It is formed in the liver by the metabolism of cocaine by hydrolysis, catalysed by carboxylesterases, and subsequently excreted in the urine.

Presence in drinking water
Benzoylecgonine is sometimes found in drinking water supplies. In 2005, scientists found surprisingly large quantities of benzoylecgonine in Italy's Po River and used its concentration to estimate the number of cocaine users in the region. In 2006, a similar study was performed in the Swiss ski town of Saint-Moritz using wastewater to estimate the daily cocaine consumption of the population. A study done in the United Kingdom found traces of benzoylecgonine in the country's drinking water supply, along with carbamazepine (an anticonvulsant) and ibuprofen (a common non-steroidal anti-inflammatory drug), although the study noted that the amount of each compound present was several orders of magnitude lower than the therapeutic dose and therefore did not pose a risk to the population.

Preliminary studies on ecological systems show that benzoylecgonine has potential toxicity issues. Research is being conducted on degradation options such as advanced oxidation and photocatalysis for this metabolite in an effort to reduce concentrations in waste and surface waters.  At environmentally relevant concentrations, benzoylecgonine has been shown to have a negative ecological impact.

See also 
 Coca alkaloids
 Dihydrocuscohygrine
 Hygrine

References 

Tropane alkaloids found in Erythroxylum coca
Recreational drug metabolites
Benzoate esters
Carboxylic acids